Trigo may refer to:
 Trigo (horse)
 Trigo, Madera County, California
 The ruler of the fictional Trigan Empire
 Trigonometry
 América del Pilar Rodrigo Trigo, Argentinian botanist
 María Cristina Trigo (1935–2014), Bolivian writer and activist